A military-style robbery of Prosegur’s office occurred in Ciudad del Este, Paraguay's border town to Brazil, on April 24, 2017. The event has been termed  “the robbery of the century” and “mega-robbery” by the media, and is the “biggest heist in Paraguay’s history".

In the night, about 50 to 80 heavily-armed robbers closed off the perimeter of the office with cars and, during a three-hour assault, were reportedly able to access at least one of the three vaults of the company. One police officer was killed, and several people were wounded. The robbers were thought to have taken between 8 million to US$40 million. According to Prosegur, US$8 million were missing from one vault.

Authorities have assumed that the robbers came from and returned to Brazil where an apparent staging house was found across the border in Foz do Iguaçu. A subgroup of the robbers was reported to be intercepted in Itaipulandia resulting in a gun battle during which three suspects were killed and four arrested. Additional suspects were arrested in Parana. Paraguayan police suspects that the First Capital Command (PCC), a criminal Brazilian gang, may be behind the robbery.

Several police chiefs of Ciudad del Este were fired after the robbery by the interior minister.

References

Ciudad del Este
Violence in Paraguay
Primeiro Comando da Capital
2017 in Paraguay
2017 murders in Paraguay